Oscar Paul Osthoff (March 23, 1883 – December 9, 1950) was an American athlete and coach.  Osthoff won the gold medal in the all-around dumbbell event and the silver medal in the two hand lift competition at the 1904 Summer Olympics.  He later attended the University of Wisconsin–Madison, where he lettered in four sports, he also was the sec of the athletic dept. he attended Marquette University his freshman year, he is in the University of Wisconsin athletic hall of fame. : football, track and field, gymnastics, and swimming.  Osthoff served as the head football coach at Washington State College—now Washington State University—from 1910 to 1911, compiling a record of 5–6.

Head coaching record

References

External links
 Olympic profile

1883 births
1950 deaths
American male weightlifters
Olympic gold medalists for the United States in weightlifting
Olympic silver medalists for the United States in weightlifting
Washington State Cougars football coaches
Wisconsin Badgers football players
Wisconsin Badgers men's swimmers
Wisconsin Badgers men's track and field athletes
Wisconsin Badgers men's gymnasts
Weightlifters at the 1904 Summer Olympics
Medalists at the 1904 Summer Olympics
People associated with physical culture
20th-century American people